Christine Gauthier (born May 6, 1970) is a Canadian sledge hockey player and paracanoeist who has competed since the late 2000s. She won a gold medal in the K-1 200 m LTA event at the 2010 ICF Canoe Sprint World Championships in Poznań. Gauthier also participated in women's ice sledge hockey. A member of the Canada women's national ice sledge hockey team since 2012, she competed in the first-ever IPC Ice Sledge Hockey Women's International Cup in 2014.

Athletic career
Her musculo-skeletic disorder affects her back, legs and hips.

Canada Women's National Sled Hockey Team
Competing at the IPC Ice Sledge Hockey Women's International Cup from November 7–9, 2014 in Brampton, Ontario, Canada, Gauthier emerged with a silver medal.

Paracanoe
At the 2015 ICF Canoe Sprint World Championships in Milan, Italy, Gauthier finished in sixth place.

Personal life 
In December 2022, Gauthier testified that a Veterans Affairs Canada employee offered her medical assistance in dying (MAiD) as an option when she is fighting for installing a wheelchair lift or ramp at her house. This has led to a national controversy, with Prime minister Justin Trudeau called the report "absolutely unacceptable". Subsequently, VA claimed they found no record that MAID has been offered as an option to Gauthier and only found four such cases, all involving a single now-suspended case manager.

References

 2010 ICF Canoe Sprint World Championships women's K-1 200 m LTA results. – accessed 20 August 2010.

1970 births
Living people
Canadian sledge hockey players
Canadian female canoeists
Paracanoeists of Canada
ICF Canoe Sprint World Championships medalists in paracanoe
LTA classification paracanoeists